Reiner Edelmann (born 19 March 1965) is a retired German footballer. He made 32 appearances in the Bundesliga for Waldhof Mannheim and Schalke 04 as well as 99 matches in the 2. Bundesliga for Preußen Münster and Schalke.

References

External links 
 

1965 births
Living people
German footballers
Association football forwards
Bundesliga players
2. Bundesliga players
Belgian Pro League players
SV Waldhof Mannheim players
FC Schalke 04 players
SC Preußen Münster players
K.V. Kortrijk players
VfR Mannheim players
SV Eintracht Trier 05 players